Cable & Wireless refers to three telecommunications businesses:

 Cable & Wireless plc - the original business, established in 1869 and split in 2010
 Cable & Wireless HKT, a Hong Kong-based former subsidiary
 Cable & Wireless Communications - the former international division of Cable & Wireless plc, demerged in 2010 and now integrated into Liberty Latin America
 Cable & Wireless Worldwide - the remaining business of Cable & Wireless plc, renamed following the demerger of Cable & Wireless Communications and now integrated into Vodafone